Irineo Álvarez (born 7 November 1967 in Guadalupe de Ures, Sonora, Mexico), is a Mexican film and television actor. He is best known for his notable films Bordertown and Chapo: el escape del siglo. In television he was made known in the telenovela La Patrona.

Filmography

Film roles

Television roles

References

External links 
 

Living people
Mexican male television actors
21st-century Mexican male actors
1967 births